Gana language may refer to:
Gǁana language, a Khoe dialect cluster of Botswana
Gana language (Nigeria)
Gana’ language, an Austronesian language of Sabah, Malaysia